Alan Gordon Anderson (born July 26, 1947) is an American guitarist, singer, and songwriter. In the 1960s, Anderson was the frontman of the band The Wildweeds, which had success with the song "No Good To Cry", which he wrote. Between 1971 and the early 1990s, he was the lead guitarist in the rock band NRBQ, also releasing several solo albums. He also played electric guitar on Jonathan Edwards's 1973 album Have a Good Time for Me.

In the 1990s, Anderson shifted his focus to country music, writing hit songs for such artists as Carlene Carter, Vince Gill, Diamond Rio and Trisha Yearwood, as well as Tim McGraw's number 1 hit "The Cowboy in Me" and several album cuts. Anderson has also released six solo albums.

Discography

Albums
Al Anderson (Vanguard Records, 1972)
Party Favors (Rykodisc, 1988)
Pay Before You Pump (Imprint Records, 1996)
After Hours (Legacy, 2006)
Pawn Shop Guitars (AAM Records, 2007)
Strings (Amigo Grande, 2012)

Singles

List of country singles composed by Anderson
Anderson has written or co-written the following country singles:
Alabama (with Jann Arden), "Will You Marry Me"
Jimmy Buffett (with Kenny Chesney), "License to Chill"
Jimmy Buffett (with Martina McBride), "Trip Around the Sun"
Carlene Carter, "Every Little Thing"
Linda Davis, "A Love Story in the Making"
Diamond Rio, "Unbelievable"
Joe Diffie, "Poor Me"
Ty England, "Should've Asked Her Faster"
The Farm, "Every Time I Fall in Love"
4 Runner, "Forrest County Line"
Vince Gill, "Next Big Thing" "Down to My Last Bad Habit"
Hot Apple Pie, "We're Makin' Up"
Hal Ketchum, "(Tonight We Just Might) Fall in Love Again", "That's What I Get for Losin' You"
Patty Loveless, "The Last Thing on My Mind"
Raul Malo, "Crying For You"
The Mavericks (with Flaco Jiménez), "All You Ever Do Is Bring Me Down"
Delbert McClinton & Dick50, "When She Cries at Night"
Tim McGraw, "The Cowboy in Me"
Nitty Gritty Dirt Band, "Bang, Bang, Bang"
The Oak Ridge Boys, "Bad Case of Missing You"
James Otto, "Groovy Little Summer Song"
Bonnie Raitt, "Not Cause I Wanted To", "Ain't Gonna Let You Go", both on the album Slipstream
LeAnn Rimes, "Big Deal"
Jeffrey Steele, "Somethin' in the Water"
George Strait, "Love's Gonna Make It Alright"
Aaron Tippin, "Without Your Love"
Mike Walker, "Honey Do"
Lari White, "Wild at Heart"
Trisha Yearwood, "Powerful Thing"

References

External links
bigalanderson.com Official Bio

1947 births
Living people
People from Windsor, Connecticut
Country musicians from Connecticut
American country rock singers
American country singer-songwriters
American rock guitarists
American male guitarists
NRBQ members
Singer-songwriters from New York (state)
Guitarists from Connecticut
Guitarists from New York (state)
Imprint Records artists
20th-century American guitarists
20th-century American male musicians
21st-century American guitarists
21st-century American male singers
21st-century American singers
American male singer-songwriters
Singer-songwriters from Connecticut